Lange Wapper is a Flemish folkloric character. He is a legendary giant and trickster whose folk tales were told especially in the city of Antwerp and its neighbouring towns, but similar tales are also prominent in other Flemish cities.

Legend
The legend started in the 16th century in Wilrijk. A farmer found an enormous garden parsley and a red cabbage in his bed. When he touched the vegetables, they turned into a cute baby. As he was unable to take care for the child it was adopted by a family living in Antwerp. Many years later the boy helped persons in need. One day he saved an old woman who was thrown into river Scheldt by a youth gang. The old woman thanked the man by giving him some gifts such as the ability to shapeshift and to make himself so tall he could move from one town to another with a single giant leap. As he preferred to be in his tall size, he got the nickname Lange Wapper. The man turned into a water sprite who liked to live near the sea, near rivers or canals. Since then, Lange Wapper used tricks to approach women to get their breast milk. He teases drunks, cheats whilst playing with children and laughs like the devil.

Stories
A man was sitting in an inn in Antwerp. When he went home, he was rather drunk. He heard feet steps behind him. The man turned around and saw another man. The drunk stopped, so did the other. The drunk ran away to his home, but he was followed. The drunk was scared and hid in his bed. Suddenly, a man knocked at the window. It was Lange Wapper who was as big as his house. Lange Wapper said: if you get drunk again, I will break your neck."

In a second story, children were playing nearby Steenplein in Antwerp. Suddenly, a rich man approached. He handed out all kind of candy. The children followed the man in the direction of Boom. Suddenly, the rich man disappeared. The only thing the children heard was a devil's laugh. They realized the man was Lange Wapper.

Another story is about Stans van 't Gansken, a wheedling woman. She hid aside a place in Antwerp where mothers could abandon their newborn babies. Stans haggled the women: if they did not give her a large amount of hush money, Stans would inform everybody that she knew about the child abandonment. Everyone paid her. One day, Stans found a baby in front of her door. She took the child and wanted to dump it at the child abandonment location. Suddenly, the baby turned into a giant. It was Lange Wapper. He beat the woman so hard she would never forget. Since then, Stans was never seen again near the child abandon location.

In a fourth story, a young woman lived nearby Groenplaats in Antwerp. She had four lovers and trumpeted around she even could handle a fifth one. One evening she invited the four lovers one by one in her house. One hour before the first lover arrived, someone knocked at the door. It was a man who presented himself as the fifth lover and invited the woman for a walk in which she agreed. Meanwhile, Lange Wapper hid in the house and used his shapeshifting gift. He wanted to know if the men really loved the woman so he gave them a task. The first man was sent to the cemetery to sit under the big cross. The second had to lay down in a coffin under the cross. The third had to knock on the coffin until someone turned up. The fourth had to walk on the cemetery with a large chain. The four men and the woman died: the first one scared to death when the second one crawled into the coffin. The second man scared to death when the third one knocked on the coffin. The third one died when he heard the noise of the chain thinking it was the devil. The fourth ran to the house of the woman, who was home from the walk, to tell his story. The woman was so scared she died of a stroke. The fourth man went crazy, jumped into the river Scheldt and drowned. The fifth man was revealed to be an assistant of Lange Wapper.

In Flemish culture
A planned but delayed controversial new bridge in Antwerp would have been called the 
Lange Wapper has a statue in front of Het Steen in Antwerp.
The giant appeared in the Belgian comics series Spike and Suzy (Suske en Wiske), namely the album De Zwarte Madam (1947)

References

Humor and wit characters
Medieval legends
Belgian culture
Fictional giants
Fictional tricksters
Belgian folklore
Belgian legends
Fictional characters from Flanders
Antwerp in fiction
Dutch legendary creatures